Rama Varma XII (died June 1844) was an Indian monarch who ruled the Kingdom of Cochin from 1837 to 1844.

Reign 

Rama Varma was a cousin of Rama Varma XI and ascended the throne on his death in November 1837. In 1840, the Diwan Venkata Subbaraya resigned and replaced with Shankara Warrier.

Death 

Rama Varma XII died at Irinjalakuda in June 1844.

References 

 

1844 deaths
Rulers of Cochin
Year of birth missing